Bournemouth Gasworks Athletic F.C. were an English amateur football team from Bournemouth, Hampshire, who were successful in both county and national competitions, reaching the final of the FA Amateur Cup in 1930. They became defunct in 1973.

History
Founded in 1899 as the Bournemouth Gas & Water Co works side and joined the Hampshire League West Division in 1904. In 1921 Bournemouth Gasworks were placed in the County Division (later to become Division One) and this marked the start of a very successful period for 'the Lights' as they were crowned champions in 1922–23. The club added the Athletic suffix to their name at this time.

The late Twenties saw the side record some fine runs in the FA Amateur Cup, most notably in 1929–30 when they reached the final, which was played at West Ham United's Upton Park stadium where a crowd of 21,800 saw them hold Ilford 1–1 at the break before they eventually lost by a 1–5 scoreline. In 1932–33 they reached the Semi-Finals but were narrowly beaten 1–2 by Stockton.

The Gasworks remained a strong force in county football and were Hampshire League Division One champions a further four times during the Thirties with the reserve side also winning the Division Two title.

Post war
The post war era saw Bournemouth Gasworks remain a prominent force in the Hampshire League and the cups. During this time they were regular entrants in the FA Cup qualifying rounds and they won the Hampshire Senior Cup in 1952–53 and 1953–54. In 1956–57 the Gasworks were relegated after finishing bottom and after a mid-table finish in Division Two the club left the Hampshire League to play in local Dorset football. They would go on to win the Dorset League nine times, as well as winning the Dorset Senior Cup ten times and the Dorset Amateur Cup nine times.

Demise

Through circumstances beyond their control, the loss of their magnificent Alder Road home ground in 1972 prompted the club's decision to call it a day after a decline in fortunes.

The final curtain came down in March 1973 the Club staged a formal Farewell Dinner to commemorate the end of an illustrious history. The event was well attended with a number of legends from the 1930 FA Amateur Cup final team in attendance.

Honours
Hampshire League Champions (5) – 1922–23, 1931–32, 1934–35, 1935–36, 1937–38
Hampshire Senior Cup Winners (2) – 1952–53, 1953–54
Dorset Senior Cup Winners (10) – 1908–09, 1909–10, 1910–11, 1911–12, 1913–14, 1920–21, 1921–22, 1924–25, 1930–31, 1938–39
FA Amateur Cup Runner-up – 1929–30 (semi-finalists 1932–33)
FA Cup – Best performance – 3rd Qualifying Round 1946–47, 1952–53, 1953–54

League Records

References

Print
Gone But Not Forgotten (Part 5), by Dave Twydell,

Internet

External links
 Football Club History Database profile of Bournemouth Gasworks Athletic F.C.
 2009 Reunion Article

Sport in Bournemouth
Defunct football clubs in England
Association football clubs established in 1899
Association football clubs disestablished in 1973
Defunct football clubs in Hampshire
1899 establishments in England
1973 disestablishments in England
Works association football teams in England